Osyp Yuriy Fedkovych (8 August 1834, Putyla - 11 January 1888, Chernivtsi) was a Ukrainian writer, poet, folklorist and translator.

Biography
Fedkovych lived in Chernivtsi, where he was a closed associate of Rudolf Neubauer, the editor of Bukowina, the first German literary supplement in the city, and also the creator of the German language literary circle in Chernivtsi.

He edited the first Ukrainian-language newspaper in Bukovina.

In 1989 Chernivtsi University was renamed Yuriy Fedkovych Chernivtsi National University in his memory.

Works
 ' The soldier's daughter'. Translated by Roma Franko. In Sonia Morris, ed., From days gone by: selected prose fiction, Toronto: Language Lanterns Publications, 2008.

References

External links
 

1834 births
1888 deaths
People from Chernivtsi Oblast
Ukrainian folklorists
Ukrainian translators
Newspaper editors
19th-century journalists
Male journalists
19th-century translators
19th-century Ukrainian poets
Ukrainian male poets
19th-century male writers
Translators of William Shakespeare
Translators of Johann Wolfgang von Goethe
German-language poets